The Ethiopian Civil War took place from 1974–1991 between Eritrean and Ethiopian rebels on one side, and the ruling Ethiopian military junta on the other.

Ethiopian civil war may also refer to:

 Battle of Segale (1916)
 Ethiopian civil conflict (2018–present)
 Tigray War